Anne M. McKim is a Scottish-New Zealand academic. She is currently Professor of English at the University of Waikato, with specialities including Medieval Studies and Eighteenth-Century Literature.

Selected works 
 Cowie, Bronwen, Rosemary Hipkins, Sally Boyd, Ally Bull, Paul Ashley Keown, Clive McGee, Beverley Cooper et al. "Curriculum implementation exploratory studies." (2009).
 Petrie, Kirsten Culhane, Alister Jones, and Anne M. McKim. "Effective professional learning in physical activity." (2007).

References

External links
 institutional homepage

Living people
New Zealand women academics
Academics from Glasgow
Alumni of the University of Edinburgh
Academic staff of the University of Waikato
Year of birth missing (living people)